Lattanzio Lattanzi (died 1587) was a Roman Catholic prelate who served as Bishop of Pistoia (1575–1587).

Biography
On 2 Dec 1575, Lattanzio Lattanzi was appointed during the papacy of Pope Gregory XIII as Bishop of Pistoia.
On 19 Feb 1576, he was consecrated bishop by Giovanni Battista Maremonti, Titular Bishop of Utica, with Antonio Giannotti da Montagnana, Bishop of Forlì, and Annibale Grassi, Bishop of Faenza, serving as co-consecrators. 
He served as Bishop of Pistoia until his death on 11 Dec 1587.

References

External links 
 (for Chronology of Bishops) 
 (for Chronology of Bishops) 

16th-century Italian Roman Catholic bishops
Bishops appointed by Pope Gregory XIII
1587 deaths